Psorothamnus schottii is a species of flowering plant in the legume family known by the common name Schott's dalea. It is native to the Sonoran Deserts of northern Mexico and adjacent sections of Arizona and the Colorado Desert in California.

Description
Psorothamnus schottii is a shrub approaching two meters in maximum height. Its highly branching stems are green to woolly gray-green and glandular. The gland-pitted linear leaves are up to 3 centimeters long and not divided into leaflets.

The inflorescence is an open raceme of up to 15 flowers. Each flower has a deep purple blue pealike corolla up to a centimeter long in a glandular tubular calyx of sepals with pointed lobes. The fruit is a legume pod coated in glands and containing one seed.

References

External links
CalFlora Database: Psorothamnus schottii (Schott indigobush, Schott's dalea, Schott's indigo bush)
Jepson Manual eFlora (TJM2) treatment of Psorothamnus schottii
USDA Plants Profile for Psorothamnus schottii
UC Photos gallery — Psorothamnus schottii

schottii
Flora of Arizona
Flora of the California desert regions
Flora of Northwestern Mexico
Flora of the Sonoran Deserts
Natural history of the Colorado Desert
Flora without expected TNC conservation status